Barhara Assembly constituency is one of 243 legislative assembly seats of the legislative assembly of Bihar. It is part of  Arrah lok sabha constituency along with other assembly constituencies viz Sandesh, Arrah, Tarari, Jagdishpur, Shahpur and Agiaon (SC).

Area/ Wards
The Barhara Assembly constituency comprises:

 CD Block Barhara
 Gram Panchayats: Ijri, Sundarpur Barja, Agarsanda, Baghipakar, Basantpur, Dhamar & Khajuria of Arrah CD Block
 Gram Panchayats: Khesrahiya, Mathurapur, Rajapur, Daulatpur, Chanda, Gidha, Birampur & Kayam Nagar of the Koilwar CD Block.

Members of the Legislative Assembly
The Barhara Assembly constituency was created in 1967. The list of the Members of the Legislative Assembly (MLA) representing Barhara constituency is as follows:

Election results

2020

References

External links
 

Politics of Bhojpur district, India
Assembly constituencies of Bihar